Avigdor a small moshav in southern Israel. Located south of Kiryat Malakhi and 11 km north of Kiryat Gat and covering 3.75 km², it falls under the jurisdiction of Be'er Tuvia Regional Council.

History
It was founded in 1950 by veterans of the British Army and was initially named Yael, the initials of Hebrew Units for Transportation, the unit that the veterans belonged to during the war. The commander of the unit was Henry d'Avigdor-Goldsmid, the son of Sir Osmond Elim d'Avigdor-Goldsmid. Later the name was changed and now it derives its name from the Zionist Sir Osmond Elim d'Avigdor-Goldsmid, an Englishman, president of the Palestine Jewish Colonization Association between the years 1934–1939 that donated to the moshav the municipality.
It was founded on the land belonging to the  depopulated Palestinian village of Qastina.

The population is partly agriculturist, and their main occupations are dairy farming, turkeys and chicken and various field crops and partly free profession (lawyer, accountant, engineer, etc.) In the last years there is a development and building momentum.

References

External links
Village website 

Moshavim
Populated places established in 1950
Be'er Tuvia Regional Council
Populated places in Southern District (Israel)
1950 establishments in Israel
 British-Jewish culture in Israel